The Frederic Parish is a civil parish of the County of Cumberland.

The Parish is in the Hornsby Shire Council, on the Hawkesbury River.

References

Parishes of Cumberland County